Durag-e Atabak (also Romanized as Dūrag-e Ātābak; also known as Dūrakātābak and Dowrak) is a village in Rostam-e Do Rural District, in the Central District of Rostam County, Fars Province, Iran. At the 2006 census, its population was 78, in 15 families.

References 

Populated places in Rostam County